Achromobacter denitrificans is a Gram-negative, oxidase and catalase-positive, strictly aerobic, ubiquitous, motile bacterium from the genus Achromobacter which was isolated from soil and can cause human infections. Formerly known as Achromobacter agile.

References

External links
Type strain of Achromobacter denitrificans at BacDive -  the Bacterial Diversity Metadatabase

Burkholderiales
Bacteria described in 2003